Stefan Meister (born 10 August 1970) is a German former yacht racer who competed in the 2000 Summer Olympics.

References

1970 births
Living people
German male sailors (sport)
Olympic sailors of Germany
Sailors at the 2000 Summer Olympics – 470
H-boat class sailors